Miyoko Asahina (朝比奈三代子; born September 24, 1969) is a retired female long-distance runner from Japan. She set her personal best (2:25:52) in the women's marathon event on April 17, 1994 to win the Rotterdam Marathon.

Achievements

References

1969 births
Living people
Japanese female long-distance runners
Japanese female marathon runners
Japan Championships in Athletics winners
20th-century Japanese women
21st-century Japanese women